The Scavenger is the name of two DC Comics supervillains with no known connections with each other. The first Scavenger was Peter Mortimer, an Aquaman villain who debuted in Aquaman #37 (January 1968), and was created by Bob Haney and Nick Cardy. He is re-introduced in the New 52 series Aquaman by writer Geoff Johns and artist Paul Pelletier.

The second Scavenger first appeared in Superboy (vol. 4) #2 (March 1994), and was created by Karl Kesel and Tom Grummett.

Fictional character biography

Peter Mortimer
In his first appearance, the first Scavenger was looking for something called the Time Decelerator, a device left on Earth by an extraterrestrial race. When he finds it, it apparently de-ages him to nothing. In his next appearance, while battling Aquaman for the second time, he explains that the Time Decelerator simply sent him into a timeless, limbo-like dimension. The Scavenger then resurfaces in the other-dimensional world of Skartaris, where he gains mystical powers, becoming the Scavenger of Souls and battling Travis Morgan, known as the Warlord. He apparently loses these mystical powers and returns to his own world sometime later.

In his next appearance, the Scavenger is shown to have reformed, also becoming a friend of Aquaman's. However, a later encounter with Hawkman retconned his redemption, stating that Peter Mortimer was secretly part of a pedophile ring who videotaped himself raping young boys and girls. Moreover, he now calls himself Barracuda and explains that he was the avatar of the barracuda, just as Hawkman is the avatar of the hawk. After Barracuda attempts to kill both Aquaman and Hawkman, Hawkman kills him.

In The New 52, after the events of Throne of Atlantis, Mortimer begins scouring the ocean floor with the help of his minions for all Atlantean technology and weaponry, then sells them off to the highest bidder. He, along with villains such as the Weapons Master, the Key, the Scarecrow, Captain Cold, and the Cheetah were all attacked, captured, tortured, and interrogated by the villain David Graves who intended to acquire information on the members of the Justice League.

Mortimer was among the villains recruited by the Crime Syndicate of America during the events of the Forever Evil story arc, and was later captured along with several other members of the Secret Society by the reformed Justice League in the aftermath of the Crime Syndicate's defeat.

Second Scavenger
The second Scavenger first appeared in Superboy (vol. 4) #2. He is an old man, with a wide range of weaponry at his disposal. Little of the man's history has been revealed, except once during "Superboy and the Ravers" he mentioned he was one of the men who originally were the Argonauts and challenged the gods, which led to his dilemmas later in life. He believes he is being persecuted by an enemy from his past, and stockpiles weapons and gadgets to be ready when the enemy strikes. The identity of the nemesis has never been revealed and only made one appearance near the end of Superboy's series in which the enemy's identity was never revealed; Scavenger suffers severe paranoia, and believes anyone who tries to stop him is working for his nemesis. He later joins the Secret Society headed by Alexander Luthor. Scavenger and other villains, including Red Panzer, are sent to Gotham City, where they go on a murderous attack against law enforcement officers.

Scavenger somehow survives to the 30th century (at least in the post-Zero Hour version of future history), where he fights Superboy and the Legion of Super-Heroes. By that time he has acquired the equipment of various 20th century superheroes.

Other versions

Flashpoint
In the alternate timeline of the Flashpoint event, the second Scavenger is a member of Deathstroke's pirates after being broken out of a floating prison by Deathstroke. During an ambush by Aquaman and Ocean Master, Scavenger opens fire at Aquaman with a gun blaster, but Aquaman dodges, causing the blast to hit his shipmate, Tattooed Man. Aquaman then snaps Scavenger's body in two by breaking his back over his knee.

In other media

Television
 A group called the Scavengers appears in Legion of Super-Heroes. This version of the group are technology thieves hired by Lex Luthor's descendant Alexis Luthor.   
 The Scavengers gang appear in the Batman: The Brave and the Bold episode "The Siege of Starro!". Batman and Booster Gold fight against them in the 31st century before returning to the present. They are seen being carried by Police Science through the Booster portal.
 The Flashpoint version of Scavenger appears in Justice League: The Flashpoint Paradox.
 The Scavenger, here named Petyr Mortikov, is the principal antagonist of the animated HBO Max miniseries Aquaman: King of Atlantis, voiced by Andrew Morgado.

References

Fictional pedophiles
Fictional rapists
DC Comics LGBT supervillains
DC Comics supervillains
Comics characters introduced in 1968
Characters created by Karl Kesel
Fictional bisexual males